This is a list of prefects of Karlovac County.

Prefects of Karlovac County (1993–present)

See also
Karlovac County

Notes

External links
World Statesmen - Karlovac County

Karlovac County